The Eureka Municipal Auditorium is a 1,600-seat indoor multipurpose arena located in Eureka, California.  It is used primarily for basketball, and contains  of arena floor space, allowing it to be used for such events as conventions and trade shows in addition to sporting events.

The arena has a  permanent stage allowing it to be used for concerts; the concert capacity of the arena is 2,300.

See also
 List of convention centers in the United States

External links
Eureka Municipal Auditorium

Convention centers in California
Indoor arenas in California
Basketball venues in California
Buildings and structures in Eureka, California